This is a list of Armenians from Nagorno Karabakh.

Arts
André, pop singer, first artist to represent Armenia in the Eurovision Song Contest in 2006
Don Askarian, filmmaker, recipient of the Golden Camera Award for Life Achievement at Int. ART Film Festival, Slovakia
Zori Balayan, novelist, journalist, public activist
Vladimir Arzumanyan, child singer, winner of Junior Eurovision Song Contest 2010

Scientists and scholars
Armen Abaghian, atomic energy specialist, Doctor of Technical Sciences, member of Russian Academy of Sciences
Artashes Arakelian (1909–1993), economist, the head of the Economy Institute of Armenian Science Academy 
Arakel Babakhanian (1860–1932), historian, publicist, writer, critic
Ivan Knuniants (1906–1990), Soviet chemist
Khoren Sargsian (1891–1970), writer, critic, the director of the Literature Institute of Armenian Academy of Sciences (1943–1947)
Armen Takhtajian (1910–2009), botanist
Ashot Hovhannisian (1887–1972), Marxist historian and Communist official
Andronik Iosifyan (1905–1993), Soviet engineer

Writers and artists
Stepan Aghajanian (1863–1940), artist, distinguished as a portrait artist
Mikael Arutchian (1897–1961), theatrical painter and designer
Hakob Gyurjian (1881–1948), sculptor 
Gevork Kotiantz (1906–1996), painter
Alexander Melik-Pashaev (1905–1964), conductor, born in Tiflis in a family from Shushi
Muratsan (1854–1908), writer, one of the most famous figures in Armenian literature
Arsen Terteryan (1882–1953), literary critic
Vagharsh Vagharshian (1894–1959), director, playwright, actor, theater and public figure

Politics and statesmen
Hambardzum Arakelian (Shakhriar) (1855–1918), public and political figure
Alexander Atabekian (1868–1933), political figure, anarchist
Artashes Babalian (1887–1959), doctor, politician
Alexander Bekzadyan (1879–1938), Soviet statesman, Soviet ambassador in Norway and Hungary
Yeghishe Ishkhanian (1886–1975), political figure
Aram Manukian (1879–1919), statesman, the founder of the First Republic of Armenia
Arkadi Ghukasyan, politician, 2nd president of Nagorno-Karabakh Republic
Bako Sahakyan, 3rd president of Nagorno-Karabakh Republic
Arayik Harutyunyan, Prime Minister of the Nagorno-Karabakh Republic (2007-2017), current President of the Nagorno-Karabakh Republic 
Robert Kocharyan, 2nd president of Armenia
Serzh Sargsyan, 3rd president of Armenia
Sahak Ter-Gabrielyan (1886–1937), Soviet statesman and politician
Tuman Tumian (1879–1906), political activist
Karen Karapetyan, Prime Minister of Armenia (2016-2018)

Military figures
Samvel Babayan (b. 1965), military commander
Nikol Duman (1867–1914), fedayee
Sergei Khudyakov (1906–1950), Soviet Marshal of the Air Force during World War II
Ivan Lazarev (1820–1879), prince, officer of the Russian army, lieutenant general
Valerian Madatov (1782–1829), Russian prince and lieutenant-general
Nelson Stepanyan (1913–1944), pilot, lieutenant colonel, Hero of the Soviet Union

Religious figures
Karekin I (Cilicia), Catholicos of Cilicia from 1943 to 1952.
Pargev Martirosyan, Primate of the Diocese of Artsakh since 1989

See also 
List of Armenians
List of Azerbaijanis from Nagorno-Karabakh

References

Great Soviet Encyclopedia
Famous Shoushians

People from the Republic of Artsakh
Nagorno-Karabakh
Armenian